Kevin Price Phillips (born November 30, 1940) is an American writer and commentator on politics, economics, and history. Formerly a Republican Party strategist before becoming an independent, Phillips became disaffected with the party from the 1990s, and became a critic. He is a regular contributor to the Los Angeles Times, Harper's Magazine, and National Public Radio, and was a political analyst on PBS' NOW with Bill Moyers.

Phillips was a strategist on voting patterns for Richard Nixon's 1968 campaign, which was the basis for a book, The Emerging Republican Majority, which predicted a conservative political realignment in national politics, and is widely regarded as one of the most influential recent works in political science.

His predictions regarding shifting voting patterns in presidential elections proved accurate, though they did not extend "down ballot" to Congress until the Republican revolution of 1994. Phillips also was partly responsible for the design of the Republican "Southern Strategy" of the 1970s and 1980s.

The author of fourteen books, he lives in Goshen, Connecticut.

Southern strategy
Phillips worked for Richard Nixon's presidential campaign in 1968, and afterwards wrote a book on what has come to be known as the "Southern strategy" of the Republican Party. The book was entitled The Emerging Republican Majority and argued that the southern states of the US would keep the Republicans winning Presidential Elections and more than offset the Northeast states, based on racial politics.

As he stated to the New York Times Magazine in 1970,

All the talk about Republicans making inroads into the Negro vote is persiflage. Even 'Jake the Snake' [Senator Jacob Javits of New York] only gets 20 percent. From now on, Republicans are never going to get more than 10 to 20 percent of the Negro vote, and they don't need any more than that... but Republicans would be shortsighted if they weakened the Voting Rights Act. The more Negroes who register as Democrats in the South, the sooner the Negrophobe whites will quit the Democrats and become Republicans. That's where the votes are. Without that prodding from the blacks, the whites will backslide into their old comfortable arrangement with the local Democrats.

The book however wasn't used in the campaign itself, Phillips notes in the preface to the Princeton Edition,

Some observers concluded that The Emerging Republican Majority was the emerging Republican strategy. Newsweek labeled the book "The political bible of the Nixon Era." Not quite. The book was not a blueprint of the GOP's "Southern Strategy" as some claimed,. ... Richard Nixon had read memos based on the book's analyses during the week before the November 1968 election, but in mid-1969 he truthfully said he had not read the actual book. He read it a few months later.

Books

American Theocracy (2006)
Rev. Dr. Allen Dwight Callahan  states the book's theme is that the Republican Party (GOP), religious fundamentalism, petroleum, and borrowed money are an "Unholy Alliance."

The last chapter, in a nod to his first major work, is titled "The Erring Republican Majority". American Theocracy, "presents a nightmarish vision of ideological extremism, catastrophic fiscal irresponsibility, rampant greed and dangerous shortsightedness."
The New York Times wrote:He identifies three broad and related trends — none of them new to the Bush years but all of them, he believes, exacerbated by this administration's policies — that together threaten the future of the United States and the world. One is the role of oil in defining and, as Phillips sees it, distorting American foreign and domestic policy. The second is the ominous intrusion of radical Christianity into politics and government. And the third is the astonishing levels of debt — current and prospective — that both the government and the American people have been heedlessly accumulating. If there is a single, if implicit, theme running through the three linked essays that form this book, it is the failure of leaders to look beyond their own and the country's immediate ambitions and desires so as to plan prudently for a darkening future.

Phillips uses the term financialization to describe how the U.S. economy has been radically restructured from a focus on production, manufacturing and wages, to a focus on speculation, debt, and profits. Since the 1980s, Phillips argues in American Theocracy,the underlying Washington strategy… was less to give ordinary Americans direct sums than to create a low-interest-rate boom in real estate, thereby raising the percentage of American home ownership, ballooning the prices of homes, and allowing householders to take out some of that increase through low-cost refinancing. This triple play created new wealth to take the place of that destroyed in the 2000-2002 stock-market crash and simultaneously raised consumer confidence.

Nothing similar had ever been engineered before. Instead of a recovery orchestrated by Congress and the White House and aimed at the middle- and bottom-income segments, this one was directed by an appointed central banker, a man whose principal responsibility was to the banking system. His relief, targeted on financial assets and real estate, was principally achieved by monetary stimulus. This in itself confirmed the massive realignment of preferences and priorities within the American system….

Likewise, huge and indisputable but almost never discussed, were the powerful political economics lurking behind the stimulus: the massive rate-cut-driven post-2000 bailout of the FIRE (finance, insurance, and real estate) sector, with its ever-climbing share of GDP and proximity to power. No longer would Washington concentrate stimulus on wages or public-works employment. The Fed's policies, however shrewd, were not rooted in an abstraction of the national interest but in pursuit of its statutory mandate to protect the U.S. banking and payments system, now inseparable from the broadly defined financial-services sector.

Critical reception
American Theocracy was reviewed widely. The New York Times Book Review wrote "It is not without polemic, but unlike many of the more glib and strident political commentaries of recent years, it is extensively researched and frighteningly persuasive..."

The Chicago Sun-Times wrote "Overall, Phillips' book is a thoughtful and somber jeremiad, written throughout with a graceful wryness... a capstone to his life's work."

Bad Money (2008)
Phillips examines America's great shift from manufacturing to financial services. He also discusses America's petroleum policies and the tying of the dollar to the price of oil. Phillips suggests that the Euro and the Chinese Yuan/Renminbi are favorites to take the dollar's place in countries hostile towards America, like Iran. He then tackles the lack of regulatory oversight employed in the housing market and how the housing boom was allowed to run free under Alan Greenspan. The book concludes with the proposal that America is employing bad capitalism and extends Gresham's Law of currency to suggest that their good capitalism will be driven out by the bad.

Bibliography
 The Emerging Republican Majority (1969)  
 Mediacracy: American Parties and Politics in the Communications Age (1974) 
 Electoral Reform and Voter Participation (with Paul H. Blackman, 1975) 
 Post-Conservative America: People, Politics, and Ideology in a Time of Crisis (1982) 
 Staying on Top: The Business Case for a National Industrial Strategy (1984) 
 The Politics of Rich and Poor: Wealth and Electorate in the Reagan Aftermath (1990) 
 Boiling Point: Democrats, Republicans, and the Decline of Middle Class Prosperity (1993) 
 Arrogant Capital: Washington, Wall Street and the Frustration of American Politics (1994) 
 The Cousins' Wars: Religion, Politics and the Triumph of Anglo-America (1999) 
 William McKinley (The American Presidents Series: The 25th President, 1897-1901) (2003) 
 Wealth and Democracy: A Political History of the American Rich (2002) 
 American Dynasty: Aristocracy, Fortune, and the Politics of Deceit in the House of Bush (2004) 
 American Theocracy: The Peril and Politics of Radical Religion, Oil, and Borrowed Money in the 21st Century (2006) 
 Bad Money: Reckless Finance, Failed Politics, and the Global Crisis of American Capitalism (2008) 
 After the Fall: The Inexcusable Failure of American Finance: An Update to Bad Money (2009) 
 1775: A Good Year for Revolution (2012)

References

Further reading
  (master's degree thesis)

External links 
 BookTalk.org - online book discussion of Bad Money
 Fmr. Top Republican Strategist Discusses The Bush Family's Rise To Power Since WWI
 Fmr. Top Republican Strategist Examines the History of the Bush Family
 Fmr. GOP Strategist Kevin Phillips on American Theocracy: The Peril and Politics of Radical Religion, Oil, and Borrowed Money in the 21st Century
 New York Times Book review of American Theocracy
 The Erring Republican Authority: Kevin Phillips is wrong about everything. Why is he taken so seriously?
 Twelve articles written by Phillips for Harper's Magazine
 VIDEO - Bad Money: Reckless Finance, Failed Politics, and the Global Crisis of American Capitalism, presentation from Kevin Phillips' book tour, April 28, 2008, Portland, Oregon.

 Booknotes interview with Phillips on The Politics of Rich and Poor, June 24, 1990.
 In Depth interview with Phillips, December 7, 2008
 C-SPAN Q&A interview with Phillips about 1775: A Good Year for Revolution, December 30, 2012

1940 births
Living people
Alumni of the University of Edinburgh
American foreign policy writers
American male non-fiction writers
American political consultants
American political writers
Right-wing populism in the United States
The Bronx High School of Science alumni
Colgate University alumni
Harvard Law School alumni
People from Goshen, Connecticut
Connecticut Republicans